John McDermott (1893–1946) was an American film director, screenwriter and actor.

Selected filmography

Director
 Dinty (1920)
 Patsy (1921)
 Her Temporary Husband (1923)
 Mary of the Movies (1923)
 The Spider and the Rose (1923)
 Manhattan Madness (1925)
 Where the Worst Begins (1925)
 The Love Thief (1926)

Screenwriter
 Fast Company (1918)
 Just Pals (1920)
 The Sky Pilot (1921)
 Three Wise Fools (1923)
 Rolling Home (1926)
 We're in the Navy Now (1926)
 Stranded in Paris (1926)
 Blonde or Brunette (1927)
 Evening Clothes (1927)
 Senorita (1927)
 She's a Sheik (1927)
 Flying Romeos (1928)
 The Fifty-Fifty Girl (1928)
 The Cohens and the Kellys in Scotland (1930)
 A Gentleman in Tails (1931)
 The Man in Evening Clothes (1931)
 Fast Workers (1933)
 Tillie and Gus (1933)
 College Rhythm (1934)
 Three Wise Fools (1946)

References

Bibliography
 Katchmer, George A. A Biographical Dictionary of Silent Film Western Actors and Actresses. McFarland, 2009.
 Stumpf, Charles. ZaSu Pitts: The Life and Career. McFarland, 2010.

External links

1893 births
1946 deaths
American film directors
American screenwriters
American male film actors
People from Green River, Wyoming
20th-century American screenwriters